Fabio Iván Restrepo (15 August 1959 – 13 February 2022) was a Colombian actor, known mainly for playing Gerardo in the film Sumas y restas by Víctor Gaviria and for his extensive career in film and television in Colombia.

Career
Restrepo worked as a taxi driver in the city of Medellín when he was discovered by director Víctor Gaviria, who offered him a leading role in his film Sumas y restas. In the 2004 film, he played a drug trafficker named Gerardo. His role earned him the recognition of specialized critics, who praised his naturalness when acting. This fact led him to be selected in a similar role in the TV series Sin tetas no hay paraíso, where he played a drug trafficker named Marcial. From then on, the actor became a recognized face of Colombian television, acting in numerous productions such as Rosario Tijeras (2010), Pablo Escobar, The Drug Lord (2012), Lady, la vendedora de rosas (2015) and Anónima (2015). He also appeared in film productions such as Satanás (2007), Garcia (2010), Edificio Royal (2012) and Talento millonario (2017).

Illness and death
Restrepo was hospitalized in the ICU of the Sagrado Corazón Clinic in Medellín on 23 December 2021, after testing positive for COVID-19, a disease that worsened because he was diabetic and hypertensive, causing pneumonia. This led to his death on 13 February 2022, at the age of 62. His son also died on 23 January from COVID-19.

Filmography

Television 
Enfermeras (2019)
HKO 1947 La popular (2019) — Cipriano Mejía  
Surviving Escobar: Alias JJ (2017) — Alirio Sandoval
Blanca (2016) — Don Gerardo
Anónima (2016)
Lady, la vendedora de rosas (2015) — Don Elmer 
En la boca del lobo (2014) — Flavio Escolar
La selección (2013) — Juan Alberto Higuita 
Pablo Escobar, The Drug Lord (2012) — Javier Ortiz (Jairo Ortega Ramírez)
La ruta blanca (2012) — Fermin
La bruja (2011) — Alcalde
Rosario Tijeras (2010) 
Tiempo final (2008) 
Plan América (2008) — Wilson Maldonado 
Sin tetas no hay paraíso (2006) — Marcial

Film 
Caballo de acero (2018) —  Carlos Santamaria
Talento millonario (2017) — Francisco Reyes
¿En dónde están los ladrones?  (2017) —  Tenorio
Usted no sabe quién soy yo Parte II (2017) — Justo  
Revenge Strategy (2016) — Miguel
Edificio Royal  (2012)
Chocó (2012) — Ramiro
García (2010) — Gomez 
Sin tetas no hay paraíso (2010) — Marcial
Satanás (2007) — Compinche taxista
Rosario Tijeras (2005) — Taxista
Sumas y restas (2004) — Gerardo "Reblujo"

References

External links 
 

1959 births
2022 deaths
20th-century Colombian male actors
21st-century Colombian male actors
Colombian male film actors
Colombian male television actors
Deaths from the COVID-19 pandemic in Colombia
People from Risaralda Department
Colombian taxi drivers